Mnais is a genus of broad-winged damselflies in the family Calopterygidae. There are about 15 described species in Mnais.

Species
These 15 species belong to the genus Mnais:

 Mnais andersoni McLachlan in Selys, 1873
 Mnais auripennis Needham, 1930
 Mnais costalis Selys, 1869
 Mnais decolorata Bartenef, 1913
 Mnais esakii Asahina, 1976
 Mnais gregoryi Fraser, 1924
 Mnais icteroptera Fraser, 1929
 Mnais incolor Martin, 1921
 Mnais maclachlani Fraser, 1924
 Mnais mneme Ris, 1916
 Mnais pieli Navas, 1936
 Mnais pruinosa Selys, 1853
 Mnais semiopaca May, 1935
 Mnais tenuis Oguma, 1913
 Mnais yunosukei (Asahina, 1990)

References

Further reading

External links

 

Calopterygidae
Articles created by Qbugbot